Warringah Rugby Club is a rugby union club based on the Northern Beaches of Sydney, New South Wales. Only located 25 km from the city centre, the club is close to many magnificent beaches, the Sydney Academy of Sport and Narrabeen Lake. The club currently competes in the New South Wales Rugby Union competitions, the Shute Shield and Tooheys New Cup. Warringah Rugby has one of the largest numbers of registered junior players in Australia.

Club history
The club was formed in 1963 due to a high demand of junior rugby players searching for clubs on the northern peninsula. Being one of the most rapidly developing areas in Sydney at the time this subsequently led to the establishment in the 1962/1963 season of the Warringah Junior Rugby Union.

The Senior Club was formed to supplement the already established Warringah Junior Rugby Union and commenced playing in the Sydney second division in 1964. Its aims were to provide rugby for juniors, colts and grade players and to eventually join the 1st Division Championship competition. In 1970 the Club won the 2nd Division 1st grade Premiership and was promoted to the 1st Division for the 1971 season.

More affectionately known as the Rats or Ratties, the club took on this tag after experiencing many difficult years with many humiliating defeats. The players were reminded by Doug Leslie Snr (Rats of Tobruk), that to give up in the face of adversity is never an option. The tradition of the Rats of Tobruk, of bonding together and making commitments in the true spirit of mateship should always be remembered and will prevail just in the same way as the Desert Rats of Tobruk prevailed. From that time on the Club became known as the Green Rats and their long held friendship with the ‘Rats of Tobruk Veterans Association’ and their legacy is honoured by a memorial on the hill at the southern end of ‘Rat Park’.

Honours
 Shute Shield 2017

International players

Australia
 Hugh Pyle
 Brett Sheehan
 Mark Gerrard
 Rod Macqueen 
 Dominic Vaughan
 Stephen Lidbury
 Mark Bell 
 Manuel Edmonds
 Lachlan Mackay
 Wycliff Palu
 Pat McCabe
 Pekahou Cowan
 Beau Robinson
 Sam Harris
 Scott Fardy

Australia A
 Mark Catchpole
 George Websdale
 Andrew Apps
 Craig Coffey
 Ray Smith

Female international players
 Bronnie Mackintosh
 Genevieve Delves
 Lisa Fiaola
 Jamie Blazejewski
 Cheryl Soon
 Jenny Williams
 Brownyn Calvert
 Helen Theunissen
 Chris Ross
 Alex Hargreaves
 Cobie-Jane Morgan
 Tui Ormsby

Other international players
  Gregor Townsend
  Abdel Benazzi
  Michael Lipman
  Danny Cipriani
  Enrique Rodríguez
  Francis Bindschedler
  Michael Ehrentraut
  James Cunningham
  Sailosi Tagicakibau
  Mungo Mason (Sevens)

References

External links
 www.warringahrugby.com.au

Rugby union teams in Sydney
Rugby clubs established in 1963
1963 establishments in Australia
Northern Beaches